Danielle Nadeau (born 11 May 1954) is a Canadian luger. She competed in the women's singles event at the 1980 Winter Olympics.

References

External links
 

1954 births
Living people
Canadian female lugers
Olympic lugers of Canada
Lugers at the 1980 Winter Olympics
Sportspeople from Montreal